The Port Harcourt Golf Club is a public golf club established in 1928. It is one of oldest golf clubs in Nigeria with an 18-hole, par 70, 5,968 yard (5,457 m) course. It was designed by Thomas Collins.

The golf club is located at 31A Forces Avenue, Old GRA, Port Harcourt, Rivers State. Over the years, the club has played host to both local and national golf tournaments.

References

External links
 phclubgolf.com

Golf clubs and courses in Port Harcourt
Landmarks in Port Harcourt
Sports venues completed in 1928
Old GRA, Port Harcourt
1928 establishments in Nigeria
20th-century architecture in Nigeria